Osterndorf is a town in the Samtgemeinde ("collective municipality") of Beverstedt (Samtgemeinde), in the district of Cuxhaven, Lower Saxony, Germany.

Towns in Lower Saxony

de:Beverstedt#Gemeindegliederung